Traci Hunter Abramson is an American mystery and suspense novelist. Her books have received Whitney Awards for best mystery/suspense novel in 2012, 2013, and 2015. Her books often feature characters involved with the FBI or CIA, inspired by her time working for the CIA. Abramson's books are known for featuring characters who are members of the Church of Jesus Christ of Latter-day Saints characters and she has a large following among readers who are members of that Church.

Education and background
Abramson grew up in Arizona and lives in Stafford, Virginia. She joined the Church of Jesus Christ of Latter-day Saints when she was twelve years old. She studied business at Brigham Young University and worked for the CIA for six years, ending in 1995. Abramson is married and has five children. She has coached the North Stafford High School swim team for over 20 seasons.

Writing
Many of Abramson's novels feature FBI or CIA agents, and she bases her books on similar situations she encountered working for the CIA as a finance officer. Since she is a former CIA employee, books that mention the CIA are reviewed by the agency to ensure that they do not reveal confidential material. Many of her characters are members of The Church of Jesus Christ of Latter-day Saints and her novels have an enthusiastic fan base among Mormon readers. Abramson's first book, Undercurrents, featured an Olympic-hopeful swimmer who is in witness protection. The Virginia Tech shooting inspired Abramson to write Lockdown, a novel about a woman who survives a school shooting. She said the process of writing the novel helped her to heal from the trauma.

Critics have praised Abramson's research and believable and likeable characters, though some of her plots have been criticized as predictable.

Awards
Abramson received the novel of the year Whitney award in 2017 for Safe House. Abramson received the best mystery/suspense Whitney Award in 2017 also for Safe House, in 2015 for Failsafe, in 2013 for Deep Cover, and in 2012 for Codeword Six other of her books have been finalists for the award: The Deep End in 2007, Royal Target and Freefall in 2008, Lockdown in 2009, Crossfire in 2010, and Smokescreen in 2011.

Smokescreen was on Deseret Book's bestseller list for the end of 2010, and Code Word was a Deseret Book top-10 bestseller in 2012.

Bibliography

Undercurrents trilogy
Undercurrents (2004) 
Ripple Effect (2005) 
The Deep End (2007)

Saint Squad series
Freefall (2008) 
Lockdown (2009) 
Crossfire (2010) 
Backlash (2010) 
Smokescreen (2011) 
Code Word (2012) 
Lock and Key (2013) 
Drop Zone (2014) 
Spotlight (2015) 
Tripwire (2018)

Royals trilogy
Royal Target (2011) 
Royal Secrets (2012) 
Royal Brides (2016) 
Royal Heir (2020)

Guardian series
Failsafe (2015) 
Safe House (2017) 
Sanctuary (2019) 
On The Run (2020) 
In Harm's Way (2021)  (scheduled release date 08March2021)

Standalone novels
Obsession (2011) 
Deep Cover (2013) 
Chances Are (2014) 
Kept Secrets (2016) 
Chance for Home (2017) 
Proximity (2018) 
Mistaken Reality (2019)  
A Change of Fortune (2020) 

Compilation works with othersTwisted Fate (2014) Entangled'' (2019)

References

Living people
Converts to Mormonism
American women novelists
Brigham Young University alumni
Novelists from Arizona
Novelists from Virginia
21st-century American novelists
Christian novelists
21st-century American women writers
People of the Central Intelligence Agency
Latter Day Saints from Virginia
People from Stafford, Virginia
Year of birth missing (living people)
Harold B. Lee Library-related 21st century articles